HMS Kingsmill (K484) was a British Captain-class frigate of the Royal Navy in commission during World War II. Originally constructed as the United States Navy Evarts-class destroyer escort DE-280, she served in the Royal Navy from 1943 to 1945 and then in the U.S. Navy as USS Kingsmill (DE-280) from August to October 1945.

Construction and transfer
The ship was ordered on 25 January 1942 as the U.S. Navy destroyer escort DE-280. She was laid down by the Boston Navy Yard in Boston, Massachusetts, on 9 July 1943 and launched on 13 August 1943. The United States transferred her to the United Kingdom under Lend-Lease on 29 October 1943.

Service history

Royal Navy, 1943-1945
The ship was commissioned into service in the Royal Navy as HMS Kingsmill (K484) on 29 October 1943 simultaneously with her transfer. She served on patrol and escort duty in the English Channel during World War II. In addition, she supported the invasion of Normandy on 6 June 1944 and took part in Operation Infatuate, the British and Canadian invasion of Walcheren Island in the Netherlands, in November 1944.

The Royal Navy returned Kingsmill to the U.S. Navy on 22 August 1945 at Harwich, England.

U.S. Navy, 1945
The ship was commissioned into the U.S. Navy as USS Kingsmill (DE-280) at Harwich on 22 August 1945 simultaneously with her return.  She departed Harwich on 26 August 1945 and steamed to the Philadelphia Naval Shipyard in Philadelphia, Pennsylvania, where she arrived on 8 September 1945. She remained there until she was decommissioned on 26 October 1945.

Disposal
The U.S. Navy struck Kingsmill from its Naval Vessel Register on 16 November 1945. She was sold on 17 February 1947 for scrapping.

References

External links
Navsource Online: Destroyer Escort Photo Archive DE 280/HMS Kingmsill (K.484)
uboat.net HMS Kingsmill (K 484)
Captain Class Frigate Association HMS Kingsmill K484 (DE 280)

 

Captain-class frigates
Evarts-class destroyer escorts
World War II frigates of the United Kingdom
World War II frigates and destroyer escorts of the United States
Ships built in Boston
1943 ships